Joseph Arthur Nelson (March 16, 1927 – July 20, 2009) was an American basketball player. He was an All-American college player at Brigham Young University (BYU).

Nelson came to BYU from Spanish Fork, Utah, after he had spent 16 months in the military during World War II. Nelson competed for BYU in basketball and track, and in his sophomore season of 1947–48, Nelson set the Skyline Conference single-game scoring record with a 37-point outing against Denver. For his career, Nelson was a three-time all-conference pick and led the league in scoring in 1948 and 1949. He was named an All-American by the Helms Athletic Foundation in 1948.

Following his college career, Nelson was drafted by the Rochester Royals in the 1950 NBA draft and played in the National Professional Basketball League for the Saint Paul Saints and Waterloo Hawks. After the 1950–51 season, Nelson quit basketball for a business career. He died on July 20, 2009.

References

External links
BYU Cougars bio

1927 births
2009 deaths
All-American college men's basketball players
American men's basketball players
American military personnel of World War II
Basketball players from Utah
BYU Cougars men's basketball players
BYU Cougars men's track and field athletes
Latter Day Saints from Utah
People from Richfield, Utah
Rochester Royals draft picks
Shooting guards
Small forwards
Waterloo Hawks players